The 2017–18 Women's Big Bash League season or WBBL|03 was the third season of the Women's Big Bash League (WBBL), the semi-professional women's Twenty20 domestic cricket competition in Australia. The tournament was scheduled from 9 December 2017 to 4 February 2018.

The final, held at Adelaide Oval, pitted the Sydney Sixers against the Perth Scorchers for the second season running. Sydney comfortably won the match by nine wickets to claim back-to-back championships. Punctuating an emphatic comeback from retirement, Sixers medium-pace bowler Sarah Coyte managed figures of 4/17 in the decider and was named Player of the Final.

Melbourne Renegades captain Amy Satterthwaite was named Player of the Tournament, although her team failed to qualify for the finals. Sixers captain Ellyse Perry was the leading run-scorer of the season, while the leading wicket-taker title was shared between the Sixers' Sarah Aley and the Scorchers' Katherine Brunt.

Teams 
Each squad featured 15 active players, with an allowance of up to five marquee signings including a maximum of three from overseas. Australian marquees were defined as players who made at least ten limited-overs appearances for the national team in the three years prior to the cut-off date (24 April 2017).

The table below lists each team's marquee players and other key details for the season.

Personnel changes

Local players 
The table below lists local player movements made ahead of the season.

Changes made during the season included:

 Sarah Coyte signed with the Sydney Sixers as a marquee replacement player.

Overseas players 
The table below lists changes to overseas marquee allocations made ahead of the season.

Changes made during the season included:

South Africa marquee Laura Wolvaardt signed with the Brisbane Heat as a replacement player.
Ireland marquee Isobel Joyce returned to the Hobart Hurricanes as a replacement player.
New Zealand marquee Katey Martin signed with the Melbourne Stars as a replacement player.
England marquee Amy Jones signed with the Sydney Sixers as a replacement player.
England marquee Fran Wilson signed with the Sydney Thunder as a replacement player.

Leadership 
Coaching changes made ahead of the season included:

 Peter McGiffin was appointed head coach of the Brisbane Heat, replacing Andy Richards.
 Tim Coyle was appointed head coach of the Melbourne Renegades, replacing Lachlan Stevens.

Captaincy changes made ahead of the season included:

Suzie Bates was appointed captain of the Adelaide Strikers, replacing Tegan McPharlin (3–9 win–loss record).
Corinne Hall was appointed captain of the Hobart Hurricanes, replacing Heather Knight (15–14 win–loss record).
Amy Satterthwaite was appointed captain of the Melbourne Renegades, replacing Rachel Priest (6–10 win–loss record).
Kristen Beams was appointed captain of the Melbourne Stars, replacing Meg Lanning (13–14 win–loss record).
Elyse Villani assumed the captaincy of the Perth Scorchers, replacing Suzie Bates (9–7 win–loss record).

Captaincy changes made during the season included:

Isobel Joyce stood in as acting captain of the Hobart Hurricanes for five games.
Erin Osborne stood in as acting captain of the Melbourne Stars for two games.

Points table

Win–loss table 
Below is a summary of results for each team's fourteen regular season matches, plus finals where applicable, in chronological order. A team's opponent for any given match is listed above the margin of victory/defeat.

Fixtures

Week 1

Week 2

Week 3

Week 4

Week 5

The Adelaide Strikers recorded the first-ever one-wicket victory in WBBL history, defeating the Melbourne Stars on the last ball of the match. Requiring three runs with one delivery remaining, Tabatha Saville scored a boundary off leg-spinning Stars captain Kristen Beams to clinch a narrow win for the Strikers.

Week 6

Week 7

Week 8

Knockout phase
All knockout phase matches were played as double headers with the men's tournament, hence the venues for both semi-finals and the final were determined using the standings of the BBL07 points table.

Semi-finals

Final

Statistics

Highest totals

Most runs

Most wickets

Awards

Player of the tournament 
Player of the Tournament votes are awarded on a 3-2-1 basis by the two standing umpires at the conclusion of every match, meaning a player can receive a maximum of six votes per game.

Source: WBBL|03 Player of the tournament

Team of the tournament 
An honorary XI recognising the standout performers of WBBL|03 was named by bigbash.com.au:
 Elyse Villani (Perth Scorchers)
 Beth Mooney (Brisbane Heat)
 Ellyse Perry (Sydney Sixers)
 Nicole Bolton (Perth Scorchers)
 Sophie Devine (Adelaide Strikers)
 Dane van Niekerk (Sydney Sixers)
 Amy Satterthwaite (Melbourne Renegades)
 Katherine Brunt (Perth Scorchers)
 Rene Farrell (Sydney Thunder)
 Sarah Aley (Sydney Sixers)
 Lea Tahuhu (Melbourne Renegades)

Young gun award 
Players under 21 years of age at the start of the season are eligible for the Young Gun Award. Weekly winners are selected over the course of the season by a panel of Cricket Australia officials based on match performance, on-field and off-field attitude, and their demonstration of skill, tenacity and good sportsmanship. Each weekly winner receives a $500 Rebel gift card and the overall winner receives a $5000 cash prize, as well as access to a learning and mentor program.

Melbourne Renegades all-rounder Sophie Molineux was named the Young Gun of WBBL|03 after scoring 318 runs and taking 6 wickets. The other nominees for the award were Sydney Sixers' Ashleigh Gardner (who took out the accolade in WBBL02), Renegades teammates Georgia Wareham and Maitlan Brown, Adelaide Strikers batter Tabatha Saville, as well as bowlers Annabel Sutherland from the Melbourne Stars and Belinda Vakarewa from the Sydney Thunder.

"Player of the match" tally
The table below shows the number of Player of the Match awards won by each player throughout the season. The career tally indicates the number of awards won by a player throughout her entire time in the league at the conclusion of the season, including awards won while previously playing for a different WBBL team.

Audience
A total of twelve matches were televised on free-to-air in the third season of Women's Big Bash League (WBBL) on Network Ten, including four on the opening weekend. The remaining 47 matches were live streamed on the Cricket Australia or MamaMia website as well as the Cricket Australia Live App  for mobile.

Below are the television ratings for every game that was broadcast by Network Ten during the season.

The Super Over of match 42 drew ratings of 296,000 nationally, and 185,000 in the 5 metro cities.

References

Further reading

Notes

External links

Series home at ESPNcricinfo

 
2017–18 Women's Big Bash League season by team
Women's Big Bash League seasons
!
Women's Big Bash League